C. Kevin Boyce is a paleobotanist. He is best known for winning a MacArthur Award in 2013. Boyce's work deals with the relationship between current and past ecosystems. Prior to his employment at Stanford, Boyce was associated with the University of Chicago.

References

Living people
Year of birth missing (living people)
Paleobotanists
Stanford University staff
Harvard University alumni
MacArthur Fellows
People from Stanford, California
California Institute of Technology alumni